Plectophanes is a genus of South Pacific araneomorph spiders in the family Cycloctenidae, and was first described by E. B. Bryant in 1935.

Species
 it contains five species, all found in New Zealand:
Plectophanes altus Forster, 1964 – New Zealand
Plectophanes archeyi Forster, 1964 – New Zealand
Plectophanes frontalis Bryant, 1935 (type) – New Zealand
Plectophanes hollowayae Forster, 1964 – New Zealand
Plectophanes pilgrimi Forster, 1964 – New Zealand

References

Araneomorphae genera
Cycloctenidae
Spiders of New Zealand